A Leap in the Dark (Czech title: Skok do tmy) is a 1964 black-and-white Czechoslovak war film directed by Vladislav Delong. The film is about three paratroopers sent from Moscow to Protectorate of Bohemia and Moravia to establish contact with local resistance.

Cast
 Martin Růžek as Štěpán Hradecký
 Jaroslav Mareš as Karel Vrána
 Radoslav Brzobohatý as Honza
 Miroslav Macháček as Eda Hertl
 Václav Voska as MUDr. Gruber
 Květoslava Houdlová as Hertl's wife
 Marie Tomášová as Zdena
 Vlastimil Hašek as Petr Vosecký

References

External links

1964 films
Czech black-and-white films
Czechoslovak black-and-white films
1960s Czech-language films
Czech war films
1964 war films
Czech World War II films
Czechoslovak World War II films
1960s Czech films